Mária Kállai (born in Szolnok, Hungary on December 5, 1957) is a Hungarian public education leader, lecturer and politician. She is a member of National Assembly of Hungary (Országgyűlés) since May 8, 2018. She is a member of the Fidesz.

Early life and career 
She attended Ferenc Verseghy High School in Szolnok and finished in 1976. In 1980, she graduated from the Eszterházy Károly Catholic University. In 1988, she graduated as a lecturer in pedagogy at the Faculty of Arts in Eötvös Loránd University. In 1999, she graduated from Janus Pannonius University with a degree in public education. She obtained his PhD degree in Budapest in 2002 in the field of education research and sports sciences.

Between 12 October 1980, she worked for the Szandaszőlős Primary School where she served as the teacher and was promoted to deputy principal. She taught at the Kodolányi János University in Székesfehérvár as an associate professor.

Between 2006 and 2012 she was the Deputy Mayor of Szolnok. On October 1, 2012, she became a government representative of the Jász-Nagykun-Szolnok County government office. In 2018 during the general elections of Hungary, she was elected member of parliament in the National Assembly of Hungary. She has been the Vice Chairman of the Cultural Committee. Since 25 June 2018 she has been the chairman of the subcommittee on the implementation, social and economic impact of deregulation and deregulation processes of the Committee on Culture.

References 

Living people
1957 births
People from Szolnok
Hungarian politicians
21st-century Hungarian politicians
Members of the National Assembly of Hungary (2018–2022)
Women members of the National Assembly of Hungary
Fidesz politicians